Rafael Nadal defeated Nicolas Kiefer in the final, 6–3, 6–2 to win the men's singles tennis title at the 2008 Canadian Open.

Novak Djokovic was the defending champion, but lost in the quarterfinals to Andy Murray.

Seeds
The top eight seeds receive a bye into the second round.

Draw

Finals

Top half

Section 1

Section 2

Bottom half

Section 3

Section 4

External links
 Draw
 Qualifying draw

Masters - Singles